The Schafkopf, with its height of 616.8 metres, is one of the few mountains of the Palatine Forest that exceeds the 600 metre mark. It lies south of the Forest's highest peak, the Kalmit, in the  Palatine Forest-North Vosges Biosphere Reserve, not far from the municipality of St. Martin and, together with the Morschenberg (608 m), Rotsohlberg (607 m) and Steigerkopf (614 m), forms a contiguous massif.
The Schafkopf is entirely forested. There are no official paths or tracks to the actual summit.

References 

Mountains and hills of Rhineland-Palatinate
Mountains and hills of the Palatinate Forest
Mountains under 1000 metres
Südliche Weinstraße